Thierry Bacconnier (2 October 1963 in Paris – 1 January 2007) was a French footballer who played in the position of left fullback. His father was a professional player in the 1960s.

Born in Paris, he initially played for Bollène and Sporting Club d'Orange, before joining Paris SG in 1980. Thierry played his first match in the D1 on 5 February 1983. A total of 95 times he defended the colors of the PSG, either in the league (75 games), Coupe de France (16 games) or in the European Cup (4 games).

He had 15 caps in the France national football team and participated in the 1984 edition of Blueberries Toulon Tournament. From 1988-1990 he played for SCO Angers, and from 1990-1992 he played for LB Châteauroux.

He had two children, Thomas and Sarah.

References

1963 births
2007 deaths
Angers SCO players
French footballers
Association football defenders
LB Châteauroux players
Paris Saint-Germain F.C. players
Footballers from Paris